Picogen is a rendering system for the creation and rendering of artificial terrain, based on ray tracing. It is free software.

Overview 
While the primary purpose of picogen is to display realistic 3D terrain, both in terms of terrain formation and image plausibility, it also is a heightmap-creation tool, in which heightmaps are programmed in a syntax reminiscent of Lisp.

The shading system is partially programmable.

Example features 
 Whitted-Style ray tracer for quick previews
 Rudimentary path tracer for high quality results
 Partial implementation of Preetham's Sun-/Skylight Model 
 Procedural heightmaps, though before rendering they are tesselated

Frontends 
Currently there is a frontend to picogen, called picogen-wx (based on wxWidgets). It is encapsulated from picogen and thus communicates with it on command-line level. Picogen-wx provides several panels to design the different aspects of a landscape, e.g. the Sun/Sky- or the Terrain-Texture-Panel. Each panel has its own preview window, though each preview window can be reached from any other panel.

Landscapes can be loaded and saved through an own, simple XML-based file format, and images of arbitrary size (including antialiasing) can be saved.

References

External links 
 
 picogens DeviantArt-Group-Page

Free 3D graphics software
3D rendering software for Linux
Global illumination software
Rendering systems
Free software programmed in C++
Software that uses wxWidgets